Merycomyia is a genus of North American deer flies in the family Tabanidae.

Species
Merycomyia brunnea Stone, 1953  - (Brown Merycomyian Tabanid Fly)
Merycomyia whitneyi Johnson, 1904

References

Insects of North America
Tabanidae
Brachycera genera